The Campeonato Sergipano Série A2 is a second level football league in Sergipe state. The competitions are organized by the Federação Sergipana de Futebol. Usually, the champions of a division are promoted in the next year to the Campeonato Sergipano.

History
Campeonato Sergipano Série A2 has been played since 1981.

Competition format
In 2011 championship was amongst the most competitive. Thirteen clubs fought in order to get promoted to the following year's first level. The two best placed clubs qualified to the final: Sete de Junho and Lagarto, leaving behind the best clubs in the first stage eliminated, Neópolis.

Boca Júnior, similar to the Argentinian world famous club, attracted heavy investments from foreigners in order to be promoted and start a new tradition against well-known local champions River Plate. But they failed, postponing the confrontation.

List of champions

Names change
SE São Cristóvão is the currently SE River Plate.

Titles by clubs

Teams in bold still active.

By city

See also
 Campeonato Sergipano

References

External links
 Federação Sergipana de Futebol official website